Tawag ng Tanghalan: All-Star Grand Resbak  (formally known as TNT All-Star Grand Resbak) was an amateur singing competition currently aired as a segment of the noontime show It's Showtime. This features ultimate resbakers and semi-finalists from season 1 to season 3 and Celebrity Champions who failed to advanced to the Live Finale of the week-long Grand Finals/Huling Tapatan in the competition.

Mark Michael Garcia from Metro Manila emerged as the first Grand Resbak Champion of this edition that spanned for 6 weeks.

Hosts and judges
Vhong Navarro, Anne Curtis, Amy Perez-Castillo, Jhong Hilario and Vice Ganda served as hosts for the All-Star Grand Resbak, with Ryan Bang,  Teddy Corpuz, and Jugs Jugueta serving as co-hosts as well as Gong.

Ethel Booba, MC Calaquian and Lassy Marquez served as guest hosts in the absence of the main hosts.

Prizes
Here is the list of prizes for the First Grand Resbak Champion.
  Cash
 Business Franchise from Potato Giant
 Recording Contract from TNT Records
 Management Contract from ABS-CBN
 TNT Trophy designed by Toym Imao

Grand Resbak Contenders

Team Alab

Team Bagsik

Team Sinag

Summary of Grand Resbakers 

Color Key:

Result Details:

Stage 1: Team Battle 
All Grand Resbak contenders were grouped into 3 teams, namely Team Alab, Bagsik and Sinag. Each teams were chose 1 contender every day. Each contender will select 1 of their top 3 song pieces to be dedicated to their opposing team.

After 2 rounds, the two contenders who got the highest combined average scores tabulated by the panel of judges will took the one of the 2 Seats of Power.

The last man standing format was based on Season 2 and 3 of the regular edition.

Seat of Power Details 
Results Details:

Stage 2: Four-way Battle

Four-Way Battle Summary Details 
Results Details:

Day 6 (December 14, 2019)

Ang Huling Tapatan (Grand Finals) 
The Grand Finals was held at ABS-CBN Studio 3 instead of large venues.

Results Details:

{|class="wikitable" style="text-align:center; font-size:90%; width:100%;"
|+Details
! width="07%" |Episode
! width="13%" |Grand Resbak Finalist
! width="05%" |Order
! width="15%" |Song
! width="08%" |Average Score
! width="10%" |Result
! width="07%" |Hurados
! width="07%" |Hosts
! width="05%" |Gong
|-
! colspan="9" |Day 1: Fight Back
|-
! rowspan="4" |Monday 
|Jex De Castro
|4
|"Never Enough"
!
| style="background-color:#fdfd96" |Advanced
| rowspan="4" |Louie OcampoDulceYeng ConstantinoKylaOgie Alcasid
| rowspan="4" |Vhong NavarroJhong HilarioVice GandaAmy Perez-Castillo
| rowspan="4" |Ryan Bang
|-
|Julius Cawaling
|3
|"I Believe"
| style="background-color:#9696FD" |17.09%
| style="background-color:#9696FD" |Advanced
|-
|Sofronio Vasquez III
|2
|"Lupa"
!
| style="background-color:#fdfd96" |Advanced
|-
|Mark Michael Garcia
|1
|"I Believe I Can Fly"
| style="background-color:#9696FD" |19.67%
| style="background-color:#9696FD" |Advanced
|-
! colspan="9" style="background:#555;" |
|-
! colspan="9" |Day 2: Heart Tatak
|-
! rowspan="4" |Tuesday 
|Jex De Castro
|2
|"Love on Top"
!
| style="background-color:#fdfd96" |Advanced
| rowspan="4" |Louie OcampoDulceMitoy YontingZsa Zsa PadillaJaya
| rowspan="4" |Vhong NavarroJhong HilarioVice GandaAmy Perez-Castillo
| rowspan="4" |Ryan Bang
|-
|Julius Cawaling
|4
|"Babalik Ka Rin"
| style="background-color:#9696FD" |18.10%
| style="background-color:#9696FD" |Advanced
|-
|Sofronio Vasquez III
|1
|"Just Once"
!
| style="background-color:#fdfd96" |Advanced
|-
|Mark Michael Garcia
|3
|"There's No Easy Way"
| style="background-color:#9696FD" |23.84%
| style="background-color:#9696FD" |Advanced
|-
! colspan="9" style="background:#555;" |
|-
! colspan="9" |Day 3: Give Back
|-
! rowspan="4" |Wednesday 
|Jex De Castro
|3
|"Isa Pang Araw"
!
| style="background-color:#fdfd96" |Advanced
| rowspan="4" |Gary ValencianoNyoy VolanteMitoy YontingK BrosasKarylle
| rowspan="4" |Vhong NavarroVice GandaJhong HilarioAmy Perez-Castillo
| rowspan="4" |Ryan Bang
|-
| style="background-color:#FBCEB1" |Julius Cawaling
| style="background-color:#FBCEB1" |4
| style="background-color:#FBCEB1" |"I Will Always Love You"
| style="background-color:#FBCEB1" |18.33%
| style="background-color:#FBCEB1" |Fourth Place
|-
|Sofronio Vasquez III
|1
|"Open Arms"
!
| style="background-color:#fdfd96" |Advanced
|-
|Mark Michael Garcia
|2
|"Back at One"
!
| style="background-color:#fdfd96" |Advanced
|-
! colspan="9" style="background:#555;" |
|-
! colspan="9" |Day 4: Throwback
|-
! rowspan="3" |Thursday 
|Jex De Castro
|1
|"One Moment in Time"
| style="background-color:#9696FD" |29.04%
| style="background-color:#9696FD" |Advanced
| rowspan="3" |Louie OcampoNyoy VolanteErik SantosYeng ConstantinoKarylle
| rowspan="3" |Vhong NavarroVice GandaAmy Perez-Castillo
| rowspan="3" |Ryan Bang
|-
|Sofronio Vasquez III
|3
|"Next in Line"
!
| style="background-color:#fdfd96" |Advanced
|-
|Mark Michael Garcia
|2
|"One Hundred Ways"
!
| style="background-color:#fdfd96" |Advanced
|-
! colspan="9" style="background:#555;" |
|-
! colspan="9" |Day 5: Jingle Best
|-
! rowspan="3" |Friday 
|Jex De Castro
|3
|"Sana Ngayong Pasko"
| style="background-color:#fdfd96" |31.94%
| style="background-color:#fdfd96" |Advanced
| rowspan="3" |Gary ValencianoKylaJayaKarylleK Brosas
| rowspan="3" |Vice GandaJhong HilarioAmy Perez-Castillo
| rowspan="3" |Ryan Bang
|-
| style="background-color:#B2EC5D" |Sofronio Vasquez III
| style="background-color:#B2EC5D" |1
| style="background-color:#B2EC5D" |"My Grown Up Christmas List"
| style="background-color:#B2EC5D" |31.12%
| style="background-color:#B2EC5D" |Third Place
|-
|Mark Michael Garcia
|2
|"This Christmas"
| style="background-color:#fdfd96" |36.94%
| style="background-color:#fdfd96" |Advanced
|-
! colspan="9" style="background:#555;" |
|-
! colspan="9" |Day 6: The Final Two
|-
! rowspan="7" |Saturday 
! colspan="5" |Round 1
| rowspan="7" |JayaNyoy VolanteKylaRandy SantiagoKarylleK BrosasMitoy YontingErik SantosKarla Estrada
| rowspan="7" |Vhong NavarroVice GandaAmy Perez-Castillo
| rowspan="7" |Ryan Bang
|-
|Jex De Castro
|2
|"Listen"
|
|
|-
|Mark Michael Garcia
|1
|"I Don't Have the Heart"
|
|
|-
! colspan="5" style="background:#555;" |
|-
! colspan="5" |Round 2
|-
| style="background-color:#B0E0E6" |Jex De Castro
| style="background-color:#B0E0E6" |1
| style="background-color:#B0E0E6" |Sarah Geronimo's Medley"Iduyan Mo""Ikot-Ikot""Kilometro" 
| style="background-color:#B0E0E6" |45.76%
| style="background-color:#B0E0E6" |Second Place
|-
| style="background-color:#fff44f" |Mark Michael Garcia
| style="background-color:#fff44f" |2
| style="background-color:#fff44f" |Chicago's Medley"You're the Inspiration""Hard to Say I'm Sorry""Glory of Love"| style="background-color:#fff44f" |54.24%| style="background-color:#fff44f" |Grand Resbak Champion|-
|}
Mark Michael Garcia (Metro Manila) emerged as the first-ever TNT All-Star Grand Resbak Champion.

 Elimination table  Color Key:Results Details'''

References
Notes

Scores

Sources

Tawag ng Tanghalan seasons
2019 Philippine television seasons